Pinkie Cooper and the Jet Set Pets was a short-lived line of fashion dolls that were developed and manufactured by the Bridge Direct that arrived in major US and international retailers in summer/fall 2013.  The line includes aspects of fashion play, travel, and pet collectibles.

Dolls
The dolls are approximately nine inches tall and are modeled after the English Toy Spaniel dog breed. The line was designed by fashion and toy designer Carter Bryant, creator of the original Bratz concept, and his sister. Bryant said that he based the dolls on his sister's real Cocker Spaniel of the same name, Pinkie Cooper.

Characters
Pinkie Cooper - the title character. She is obsessed with everything fashion. She is also the founder of the Pinkie Post website, and her favorite fashion capitol is New York City. Pinkie's fashion sense is elegant and uptown with a touch of the unexpected, her design skill is making any found object into jewelry, and her fashion mantra is "Dress to Express!". She is from St. Louis, Missouri. Her signature color is pink.
Ginger Jones - one of Pinkie's best friends. She is a creative expert designer, and she always comes up with the best designs. She dreams of having her own fashion collection. Ginger's fashion sense is ultra-girly with many dainty touches, her design skill is creating a perfect outfit in a nick of time, and her fashion mantra is "A smile is the best accessory!". She is from Los Angeles, California. Her signature color is purple.
Pepper Parson - one of Pinkie's best friends. She is a famous DJ and music lover, and she always comes up with the best music. She believes life is an adventure and likes trying new things. Pepper's fashion sense is off-beat, eclectic combinations with ethnic touches, her special skill is finding the perfect playlist for any occasion, and her fashion mantra is "Don't be afraid to break the rules!". She is from New York City. Her signature color is blue.
Lil' Pinkie - Pinkie's puppy. She loves to be groomed and, though prefers to retain her beauty, she has perfect poise. She is also able to sense any fashion faux pas.
Sprinkles - Ginger's puppy. She loves to be pampered and, though can be a bit spoiled, she believes in being fashion-forward. She can also read Ginger's mind.
Saltine - Pepper's puppy. She was found at an animal rescue shelter. She is red carpet-bond and a showstopper, though she also enjoys getting dirty.

Products

Travel Collection 
 London Pinkie
 Paris Pinkie
 Beverly Hills Pinkie

Runway Dolls 
 Pinkie Cooper
 Ginger Jones
 Pepper Parson

These are the first dolls to feature Ginger Jones and Pepper Parson.

Jet Set Pets 
 Lil' Pinkie
 Sprinkles
 Saltine

These products match the 'Night Out' fashion packs (See below)

Fashion Packs (Night Out)
 Vintage (Pinkie Cooper)
 Dance Recital Gala (Ginger Jones)
 Benefit Gala (Pepper Parson)

Jet Setting Case 
Looks like a suitcase, it holds:

 2 dolls
 2 dogs
 Three to four sets of shoes
 Passport and brush
 Two or three sets of wigs
 Four purses
 One to two dresses

Official website
The official website was launched in July 2013. It features character profiles, games and downloadable crafts with wallpapers, videos and webisodes, merchandise list and a blog named Pinkie Post.

Webisodes

Legacy

Pinkie Cooper and the Jet Set Pets is the basis for Eddy Atoms' 2018 graphic novel Pinky & Pepper Forever.

References

Fashion dolls
2010s toys